The 2003 FIS Freestyle World Ski Championships were held between January 31 and February 2 at the Deer Valley ski resort in northern Utah near Park City, United States.  The World Championships featured both men's and women's events in the Moguls, Aerials and Dual Moguls.

Results
The moguls and aerials events held qualifying rounds and finals.  Men's and Women's qualifying and final rounds were held on the same day with two days in between the qualifying and final rounds of each sex.  The Dual Moguls event for both sexes held only a finals round.

Men's results

Moguls
The men's quarterfinals took place on January 29 followed by the finals on January 31.

Aerials
The men's quarterfinals took place on January 30 followed by the finals on February 2.

Dual Moguls
The men's finals took place on February 2.

Women's results

Moguls
The women's finals were held on January 31.

Aerials
The women's finals were held on February 1.

Dual Moguls
The women's finals were held on February 1.

References

External links
 FIS Home
 Results from the FIS

2003
2003 in American sports
2003 in freestyle skiing
Freestyle skiing competitions in the United States
Skiing in Utah